Talking Stick Resort is a luxury hotel and casino resort located on the Salt-River Pima Maricopa Indian Reservation near Scottsdale, Arizona.  The hotel tower, which was designed by FFKR Architects, has 15 stories and stands at 200 feet and six inches.  Talking Stick Resort is independently owned and operated by the Salt River Pima-Maricopa Indian Community (SRPMIC). 

 In total, Talking Stick Resort occupies 55.6 acres with an additional 20 acres for extra parking space. The 240,000 square feet property includes a 98,000 square feet casino, 496 guest rooms, 21 meeting rooms, six entertainment lounges and five restaurants. It also contains a 25,000 square feet Grand Ballroom, a spa spanning 13,000 square feet, a fitness center, Showroom that seats 650 and four pools. In April 2014, Talking Stick Resort renovated its pool area, adding a new lounge pool and a stage for outdoor concerts. Entertainers who have performed on the poolside stage include Journey, Foreigner, Bad Company and Hollywood Vampires. In addition to Talking Stick Resort's headline concerts, the RELEASE Pool Parties have also attracted an array of world renowned DJs including Kaskade, Steve Aoki, and Skrillex.

History 
Prior to opening as Talking Stick Resort, the land was the location of Casino Arizona 101 & Talking Stick Way. It opened in 1999 with 332 slot machines and 45 table games. In 2003 the property was expanded to include blackjack, poker, keno and a sports bar.
 
In September 2006, ground was broken at the future site of Talking Stick Resort. Phoenix-based company, Chanen Construction Company, Inc. led the construction of the project.

Casino Arizona 101 & Indian Bend remained opened throughout construction until the resort’s opening. The temporary structure that housed Casino Arizona was then auctioned as were the majority of its contents.

On April 15, 2010, Talking Stick Resort opened on the former site of Casino Arizona at 101 and Talking Stick Way. An official grand opening took place on June 10.

On August 11, 2018, a massive monsoon storm flooded Talking Stick Resort Casino's generator, backup generator, and portions of the hotel and casino, forcing all guests to be immediately evacuated. It remained entirely closed while massive cleanup and power restoration efforts took place.  The resort re-opened over a month later on September 24, 2018.

Hotel 
The hotel houses 496 deluxe rooms with 15 luxury suites and 30 executive king suites. 
The architectural design of Talking Stick Resort mirrors the Salt River Pima-Maricopa Indian Community through the use of native stones, plants and earth-tone color schemes.

Gaming 
Talking Stick Resort’s gaming floor covers 98,000 square feet. It includes more than 850 slot machines, 54 tables of Blackjack, Three Card Poker, Let It Ride and Lucky Ladies.

Talking Stick Resort is home to the ARENA Poker Room that features 49 poker tables including Texas Hold ‘Em, 7-Card Stud and Omaha.  The ARENA Poker Room also hosts the annual Arizona State Poker Championship and Arizona State Ladies Poker Championship.
Talking Stick Resort also offers Keno games in its Keno hall.

Shows 
Prior to the opening of Talking Stick Resort, Casino Arizona 101 & Talking Stick Way was the first gaming facility to produce and televise its own sports show titled, “We’ve Got Your Game.”  The show went on to air more than 200 episodes and featured such sports figures as Troy Aikman, Amar'e Stoudemire, Steve Nash, Kyle Petty, Mike Tyson and Mike Ditka.
Since 2011, Talking Stick Resort has been the host of Phoenix Fashion Week.

Attractions 
Talking Stick Resort has six restaurants throughout the facility including Orange Sky, Ocean Trail, Blue Coyote Café, Blue Coyote Cantina, Wandering Horse Buffet and Black Fig Bistro. 
There is also a Cultural Center in the hotel lobby that features Native American artworks, photographs, paintings and jewelry that reflect the Pima and Maricopa Indian heritages.

The property is located in the Talking Stick Entertainment District. Other nearby attractions include Talking Stick Resort Golf Club, the Pavilions at Talking Stick Resort, Butterfly Wonderland, and Major League Baseball's newest spring training complex, Salt River Fields at Talking Stick, which opened in 2011 and is the spring base of the Arizona Diamondbacks and the Colorado Rockies.
On December 2, 2014, the venue purchased the naming rights of the former U.S. Airways Center and re-branded it as the Talking Stick Resort Arena in 2015.

See also
List of casinos in Arizona

References

External links

Official website 

Hotels in Arizona
Buildings and structures in Scottsdale, Arizona
Tourist attractions in Scottsdale, Arizona
Casino hotels
Casinos in Arizona
2010 establishments in Arizona
Hotels established in 2010
Hotel buildings completed in 2010
Casinos completed in 2010